As-Salif (also transliterated as al-Salif) is a coastal village in western Yemen. It is located in a bay of a headland that forms the southern coast of the Kamaran Bay. As-Salif is recognized for its large deposits of rock salt. Historically, the salt was exported to India. The salt is mined by a government-owned corporation.

References 

Populated places in Al Hudaydah Governorate
Port cities in the Arabian Peninsula
Populated coastal places in Yemen